"Wait Till I Can Dream" is a song by Tomoko Kawase, released as the first single under Tommy Heavenly6. It was released at the same time as Tommy February6's single, "Love is Forever".  The song peaked at #5 in Japan and stayed on the charts for 8 weeks.

Music video
In the beginning of the music video, we see Tommy February6 taking off her glasses and donning a much more alternative look to become Tommy heavenly6.

Track listing
Wait 'till I Can Dream
Swear
Melancholy Power ++

DVD Track Listing
Wait 'till I Can Dream (PV)
Swear (PV)
Wait 'till I Can Dream (PV) (Karaoke)
Swear (PV) (Karaoke)

External links
 Wait Till I Can Dream music video on Niconico (published by カミワザ)

2003 singles
Tomoko Kawase songs
2003 songs
Defstar Records singles